Theophilus Momolu Gardiner (1870 - 1941) was bishop of the Episcopal Diocese of Liberia. He was consecrated on June 23, 1921.

References

1870 births
1941 deaths
Bishops of the Episcopal Church (United States)
Anglican bishops of Liberia